Nils Allen "Booboo" Stewart Jr. (born January 21, 1994) is an American actor. He is known for playing Seth Clearwater in The Twilight Saga, Warpath in X-Men: Days of Future Past, Jay in the Disney television film franchise Descendants, Luca in Good Trouble and Willie in Julie and the Phantoms.

Early life
Booboo Stewart was born in Beverly Hills, California. His father, Nils Allen Stewart, is a professional stuntman. His mother is of Japanese, Chinese, and Korean descent while his father is of Russian, Scottish, and Native American (Blackfoot) descent.

Stewart is the older brother of actress Fivel Stewart. He was a former member of T-Squad, a Disney hip-hop/pop group, and performed with his sisters, Fivel and Maegan, as part of "TSC" (The Stewart Clan).

Career

Early career 
During 2006–2010 Stewart appeared or starred in several independent, direct-to-video, or TV films. He also hosted six episodes of the children's show Blue Dolphin Kids in Hawaii, and did stunt work on several films including the 2006 film Zoom and the 2007 film Beowulf. He had roles on episodes of Steve Harvey's Big Time Challenge, ER, Dante's Cove, Everybody Hates Chris and R.L. Stine's The Haunting Hour. Stewart also toured with Hannah Montana/Miley Cyrus on her Best of Both Worlds Tour featuring the Jonas Brothers and in the Camp Rock Freestyle Jam concert series. He recorded the opening theme for the Disney Channel Games 2008 titled "Let's Go!", and in 2010 "Under the Sea" (from The Little Mermaid) for the Disney recompilation disc DisneyMania 7. He promoted clothes, as well as toys and games such as Wii Fit and Hot Wheels. He also played Roman in Lab Rats: Elite Force.

During 2006–2008, he was a member of the musical group T-Squad.

2010–present: Theatrical debut
In 2010, Stewart appeared in the movie Logan, a coming of age story about two brothers. He portrayed Seth Clearwater in The Twilight Saga: Eclipse, the third installment of The Twilight Saga film series, as well as The Twilight Saga: Breaking Dawn - Part 1 in 2011 and The Twilight Saga: Breaking Dawn - Part 2 in 2012.

In 2012, Stewart starred in the movie White Frog as Nick Young, a teen with Asperger's syndrome. In 2013, he played the lead role in Running Deer, an award-winning short film produced and directed by Brent Ryan Green through Toy Gun Films. Stewart also appeared in 2014's X-Men: Days of Future Past acting as Warpath.

In 2013, Stewart appeared in Space Warriors alongside Danny Glover, Dermot Mulroney, Josh Lucas, Mira Sorvino, directed by Sean McNamara.

Stewart starred in the 2015 Disney Channel original movie Descendants as Jay, the son of Jafar. He reprised his role in the 2017 and 2019 sequels, Descendants 2 and Descendants 3. In 2020, Stewart appeared as Willie in the Netflix series Julie and the Phantoms, and as Peter Dragswolf in the film Let Him Go.

Philanthropic activities

In 2010, he was named a Celebrity Ambassador by the Muscular Dystrophy Association. In his role, Stewart is helping raise awareness in the fight against muscle diseases. He is also part of MDA's "Make a Muscle, Make a Difference" PSA campaign, being featured in print and TV advertisements. He also travelled to Perth, Australia for the Channel 7 Telethon, raising money for the Princess Margaret Hospital for Children. Stewart and his sister Fivel also hosted free concerts on behalf of the national non-profit organization Childhelp.

He appeared in a PETA campaign, encouraging people to adopt animals rather than to buy them from pet stores. He is also involved in Four Green Steps, an environmental organization based in Canada.

Filmography

References

External links

 
 
 

1994 births
21st-century American male actors
American Jeet Kune Do practitioners
American male actors of Chinese descent
American male actors of Japanese descent
American male actors of Korean descent
American film actors of Asian descent
American male child actors
American male film actors
American male television actors
American people of Blackfoot descent
American people of Russian descent
American people of Scottish descent
Living people
Male actors from Beverly Hills, California
Male actors from California
Walt Disney Records artists